Shroud usually refers to an item, such as a cloth, that covers or protects some other object. The term is most often used in reference to burial sheets, mound shroud, grave clothes, winding-cloths or winding-sheets, such as the famous Shroud of Turin, tachrichim (burial shrouds) that Jews are dressed in for burial, or the white cotton kaffan sheets Muslims are wrapped in for burial. 

A traditional Orthodox Jewish shroud consists of a tunic; a hood; pants that are extra-long and sewn shut at the bottom, so that separate foot coverings are not required; and a belt, which is tied in a knot shaped like the Hebrew letter shin, mnemonic of one of God's names, Shaddai. Traditionally, mound shrouds are made of white cotton, wool or linen, though any material can be used so long as it is made of natural fibre. Intermixture of two or more such fibres is forbidden, a proscription that ultimately derives from the Torah, viz., Deut. 22:11. An especially pious Jewish man may next be enwrapped in either his kittel or his tallit, one tassel of which is defaced to render the garment ritually unfit, symbolizing the fact that the decedent is free from the stringent requirements of the 613 mitzvot (commandments). The shrouded body is wrapped in a winding sheet, termed a sovev in Hebrew (a cognate of svivon, the spinning Hanukkah toy that is familiar under its Yiddish name, dreidel), before being placed either in a plain coffin of soft wood (where required by governing health codes) or directly in the earth.

The Early Christian Church also strongly encouraged the use of winding-sheets, except for monarchs and bishops. The rich were wrapped in cerecloths, which are fine fabrics soaked or painted in wax to hold the fabric close to the flesh. Early Christian shrouds incorporated a cloth, the sudarium, that covered the face, as depicted in traditional artistic representations of the entombed Jesus or His friend, Lazarus (John 11, q.v.). An account of the opening of the coffin of Edward I says that the "innermost covering seems to have been a very fine linen cerecloth, dressed close to every part of the body". Their use was general until at least the Renaissance – clothes were very expensive, and they had the advantage that a good set of clothes was not lost to the family.
In Europe in the Middle Ages, coarse linen shrouds were used to bury most poor without a coffin. In poetry shrouds have been described as of sable, and they were later embroidered in black, becoming more elaborate and cut like shirts or shifts.  

Orthodox Christians still use a burial shroud, usually decorated with a cross and the Trisagion. The special shroud that is used during the Orthodox Holy Week services is called an Epitaphios. Some Catholics also use the burial shroud particularly the Eastern Catholics and traditionalist Roman Catholics.

Muslims as well use burial shrouds that are made of white cotton or linen.  The Burying in Woollen Acts 1666–80 in England were meant to support the production of woollen cloth.

See also
 Sudarium of Oviedo
 Islamic funeral

References

External links
 

Eastern Christian liturgical objects
Catholic liturgy
Death customs
Religious practices